Palan Mulonda is a Zambian Judge of the Constitutional Court, diplomat and human rights advocate. He is a former ambassador of Zambia to the United States a former state advocate and international law adviser to the attorney-general of Zambia. He has also acted as legal adviser to various government international negotiations in transactions concerning the energy, defense, telecommunications, commerce and trade, agriculture and mining sectors.  He now serves on the highest judicial tribunal as one of seven justices of the Constitutional Court.

References 

1972 births
Ambassadors of Zambia to the United States
Living people
University of Zambia alumni